Muhammad Abdul Ghaffar Abdulla (born 15 January 1949) is a Bahraini ambassador.

Career
Ghaffar Abdulla joined the foreign Service in 1975. From 1977 to 1979 he was employed at the Embassy in Amman, Jordan. From 1979 to 1984 he was a member of Bahrain's delegation to the UN General Assembly, and took part in the Gulf Cooperation Council Summit Conferences, as well as those of the Arab League and Non-Aligned Nations. From August 1990 to 1994 he was Bahrain's Permanent Representative united  at the United Nations headquarters. From 1994 to April 2001 he was Ambassador in Washington, D.C. with concurrent Diplomatic accreditation to Ottawa (Canada) from 1996 and Buenos Aires (Argentina) from 1998.

He was appointed Minister of State for Foreign Affairs (a rank comparable to deputy secretary of state) three times, on 17 April 2001, 11 November 2003, and again on 14 January 2005. He was appointed Minister of Information on 11 December 2006.

From 2008 to 2009 he was Ambassador in Brussels (Belgium) and concurrent representative to the European Union and non-resident Ambassador to Luxembourg. From 9 December 2009 to 5 February 2015 he was Chairman of the Board of Trustees for the Bahrain Center for Strategic, International and Energy Studies. From 29 June 2009 to 6 December 2014 he was an Advisor for Diplomatic Affairs to Hamad bin Isa Al Khalifa (Royal Decree n°57) Since  he has been Bahrain's ambassador in Paris.

References

1949 births
Living people
Permanent Representatives of Bahrain to the United Nations
Ambassadors of Bahrain to the United States
Ambassadors of Bahrain to Belgium
Ambassadors of Bahrain to France
Binghamton University alumni